Mount Bosavi Rural LLG is a local-level government (LLG) of Southern Highlands Province, Papua New Guinea.

Wards
01. Ludesa
02. Bona
03. Waragu
04. Bobole
05. Filisado
06. Dodomona
07. Banisa
08. Wanagesa
09. Fogomayu
10. Musula
11. Lake Campbell
12. Gunigamo
13. Igiribisado

References

Local-level governments of Southern Highlands Province